Owoh Chimaobi Chrismathner (born 20 March 1990) professional known by his stage name Zoro or Zoro Swagbag, is a Nigerian musician who raps in Igbo language.

Singles 
"Mabuza" (2016)
"Ogene" (2016)
"Achikolo" (2016)
"Landlady" (2017)
"One on One" (2018)
"Escorpión” feat. Yerch) [2021]
"Naira to pounds" (2022)

Awards and nominations

References 

Living people
Musicians from Lagos State
Nigerian male musicians
Nigerian male rappers
21st-century Nigerian musicians
People from Onitsha
21st-century male musicians
1990 births